The 1992–93 2. Bundesliga season was the nineteenth season of the 2. Bundesliga, the second tier of the German football league system. It was the only season the league consisted of twenty four clubs in a single division, caused by the ongoing integration of clubs from the former East Germany.

SC Freiburg, MSV Duisburg and VfB Leipzig were promoted to the Bundesliga while SpVgg Unterhaching, Eintracht Braunschweig, VfL Osnabrück, Fortuna Düsseldorf, VfB Oldenburg, SV Darmstadt 98 and FC Remscheid were relegated to the Oberliga.

League table
For the 1992–93 season Wuppertaler SV, VfL Wolfsburg and SpVgg Unterhaching were newly promoted to the 2. Bundesliga from the Oberliga while Stuttgarter Kickers, F.C. Hansa Rostock, MSV Duisburg and Fortuna Düsseldorf had been relegated to the league from the Bundesliga.

Results

Top scorers
The league's top scorers:

References

External links
 2. Bundesliga 1992/1993 at Weltfussball.de 
 1992–93 2. Bundesliga at kicker.de 

1992-93
2
Germany